East Side San Jose is the debut album by American guitarist and keyboardist Clifford Coulter recorded in 1970 for the Impulse! label. The album title refers to East San Jose, California, with the cover art showing a scene from the district.

Reception
The Allmusic review awarded the album 3 stars.

Track listing
All compositions by Clifford Coulter
 "Do It Again" - 4:44   
 "East Side San Jose" - 3:23   
 "Prayer Garden" - 3:06   
 "Cliff's Place" - 7:10   
 "Sal Si Puedes (Get Out If You Can)" - 8:05   
 "Big Fat Funky Shirley" - 4:08   
 "Alum Rock Park" - 5:42  
Recorded at Wally Heider Sound Studios in San Francisco, California and Vault Recording Studios in Los Angeles, California in April and May, 1970

Personnel
Clifford Coulter - piano, organ, electric piano, guitar, vocals
John Turk - trumpet
Gino Landry - alto saxophone
Cornelius Bumpus - tenor saxophone 
Mel Brown - guitar
Jerry Perez - rhythm guitar
Jimmy Calhoun - electric bass
Billy Ingram (tracks 4 & 6), Joe Provost (tracks 1-3, 5 & 7) - drums

References

External links
 Clifford Coulter-East Side San Jose at Discogs

Impulse! Records albums
Clifford Coulter albums
1970 albums
Albums recorded at Wally Heider Studios